Robat Rural District may refer to:

Robat Rural District (Lorestan Province)
Robat Rural District (Razavi Khorasan Province)

See also
Robat-e Jaz Rural District